The AFL Grand Final is held annually on or near the last Saturday afternoon in September. Each year, pre-match entertainment is provided by musicians from past and present.

See also
AFL Grand Final Sprint

References

Pre-match performances
Australian rules football-related lists
Australian entertainment-related lists
Lists of concerts and performances by location